The women's doubles Tournament at the 2000 Indian Wells Masters took place between March 10 and March 19 on the outdoor hard courts of the Indian Wells Tennis Garden in Indian Wells, California, United States. Lindsay Davenport and Corina Morariu won the title, defeating Anna Kournikova and Natasha Zvereva in the final.

Seeds

Draw

Finals

Top half

Bottom half

References
 Main Draw

Indian Wells Masters - Women's Doubles
Doubles women